Finding Farideh is a 2018 Iranian documentary film directed by Kourosh Ataee and Azadeh Moussavi. The film is about a 40-year-old woman raised by an adoptive Dutch family who wants to travel to Iran in search of her birth parents. The documentary was selected as the Iranian entry for the Best International Feature Film at the 92nd Academy Awards, but it was not nominated.

Cast
 Eline Farideh Koning

See also
 List of submissions to the 92nd Academy Awards for Best International Feature Film
 List of Iranian submissions for the Academy Award for Best International Feature Film

References

External links
 

2018 films
2018 documentary films
Iranian documentary films
2010s Persian-language films